Diabulimia (a portmanteau of diabetes and bulimia), also known as ED-DMT1 (eating disorder-diabetes mellitus type 1) in the US or T1ED (type 1 eating disorder) in the UK, is an eating disorder in which people with type 1 diabetes deliberately give themselves less insulin than they need or stop taking it altogether for the purpose of weight loss. Diabulimia is not recognized as a formal psychiatric diagnosis in the DSM-5. Because of this, some in the medical or psychiatric communities use the phrases "disturbed eating behavior" or "disordered eating behavior" (DEB in both cases) and disordered eating (DE) are quite common in medical and psychiatric literature addressing patients who have type 1 diabetes and manipulate insulin doses to control weight along with exhibiting bulimic behavior.

Diabulimia is caused by a range of factors relating to body image, the regular use of insulin, and emotional well-being. Insulin can cause weight gain, and a person who restricts insulin may lose weight. Insulin restriction can lead to the common symptoms of uncontrolled hyperglycaemia, which risks complications and a shorter life expectancy. Treatment involves cognitive behavioural therapy, and other support services offered by a multidisciplinary team who work both in diabetes medicine and on eating disorders.

Diabulimia is most common in young people, and most of the severe cases tend to occur in women. Research into effective management strategies is ongoing, with a growing medical consensus on the importance of early intervention with specialist teams. People with diabulimia often suffer both from clinicians and from friends and family, partly due to the lack of understanding of the condition.

Signs and symptoms 

A person with diabulimia, especially if not treated early, can result in negative effects on the body earlier than one who is managing properly. Of diabetics who have a DEB, some intentionally misuse insulin to control weight. This may also involve irregular eating patterns.

Suspension of insulin combined with overeating can result in ketoacidosis. Multiple hospitalizations for ketoacidosis or hyperglycemia are cues to screen for an underlying emotional conflict.

Short term 
The short-term symptoms of diabulimia are:
 Frequent and excessive urination
 Frequent and excessive thirst
 Frequent and excessive hunger
 High blood glucose levels (often over 600 mg/dL or 33 mmol/L)
 Weakness
 Fatigue
 Large amounts of glucose in the urine (glycosuria)
 Inability to concentrate
 Electrolyte disturbance
 Severe ketonuria, and, in DKA, severe ketonemia
 Low sodium levels

Medium term 
These are the medium-term symptoms of diabulimia. They are prevalent when diabulimia has not been treated and hence also include the short-term symptoms.
 Muscle atrophy
 GERD
 Indigestion
 Severe weight loss
 Proteinuria
 Moderate to severe dehydration
 Edema with fluid replacement
 High cholesterol

Long term 
If a person with type 1 diabetes who has diabulimia has the disease for more than a short time—usually due to alternating phases during which insulin is injected properly and relapses during which they have diabulimia—then the following longer-term symptoms can be expected:

 Delayed puberty (and dysmenorrhoea or amenorrhoea in women) in young people
Severe kidney damage: high blood sugar can overwork the kidneys, eventually leading to kidney failure and the need for a kidney transplant 
 Severe neuropathy (nerve damage to hands and feet)
 Extreme fatigue
 Edema (during blood sugars controlled phases)
 Heart problems
 Retinal damage and subsequent vision problems
 High cholesterol (hypercholesterolaemia)
 Osteoporosis
 Death

Causes 
Diabulimia is caused by a range of factors relating to body image, the regular use of insulin, and emotional well-being. The long-term management of type 1 diabetes often involves dietary restrictions for control of blood sugar level, which can raise a negative attention to diet. There is often a focus on the fact that insulin can cause weight gain, and that not using insulin can cause weight loss. This increases the risk of eating disorders such as anorexia nervosa and bulimia nervosa. The vast majority of people with diabulimia are aware of the negative side effects that hyperglycaemia can cause. Skipping insulin can lead to weight loss without side effects at first, but the risk of side effects gets progressively worse - by this time, it is more difficult to change behaviour.

Often, people with type 1 diabetes who omit insulin injections will have already been diagnosed with an eating disorder such as anorexia nervosa, bulimia nervosa, or EDNOS. These individuals often think diabulimia is less common than it is and do not know how difficult it is to overcome. Unlike anorexia and bulimia, diabulimia sometimes requires the affected individual to stop caring for a medical condition. Unlike vomiting or starving, there is sometimes no clear action or willpower involved.

Prognosis 
Diabulimia appears to lower life expectancy compared to other patients with type 1 diabetes, with the mean age of death around 45 (13 years lower than that for type 1 diabetes without an eating disorder). This reduced life expectancy is correlated with the severity of eating disorder behaviours.

Treatment 
There are no specific guidelines for the treatment of diabetes and disordered eating. The standard approach for treatment of two complex conditions involves a multidisciplinary team of professionals. This team may include an endocrinologist, a psychiatrist, a psychologist, and a dietician. Therapies may involve cognitive behavioural therapy. Family involvement and family therapy is helpful for long-term maintenance of good behaviours with taking insulin. A positive mindset to recovery, and connection with others who have experienced diabulimia, increases the probability of successful recovery. Even with treatment, relapse is common (some estimate over 50% relapse within 6 years), requiring long-term reassessment for early intervention.

Epidemiology 
Diabulimia is most common in women, and in people between 15 and 30 years old. Around 40% of men with type 1 diabetes may have skipped insulin injection at least once, and around 20% of women. Some studies have found that up to 60% of people with type 1 diabetes deliberately restrict insulin at some point.

Many articles and studies further conclude that diabetic females have, on average, higher body mass index (BMI) than their nondiabetic counterparts. Girls and young adult women with higher BMIs are also shown to be more likely to have disordered eating behavior (DEB). Many authoritative articles show that preteen and teenage girls with type 1 diabetes have significantly higher rates of eating disorders of all types than do girls without diabetes.

History 
Diabulimia is not currently recognised in the DSM-5. Current diagnoses are based on the idea of insulin restriction being a feature of existing anorexia nervosa and bulimia nervosa. Diabulimia is gaining notability within scientific research. In 2019, NHS England began trialling specialist diabulimia clinics. Whilst access to eating disorder clinics is improving, access to specialist diabulimia services is not widely available.

Society and culture 
A lack of recognition of diabulimia by clinicians leads to generally negative medical interactions. There is also a lack of public awareness. A lack of medical understanding creates social stigma. Because diabulimia tends not to involve significant eating restriction like anorexia nervosa, or purging as in bulimia nervosa, some do not recognise the significance of diabulimia. A BBC documentary in 2017 caused a significant increase in requests for specialist medical training for diabulimia, and improved public awareness.

See also 
Diabetes mellitus
Bulimia nervosa
Eating disorder

References 

Eating disorders
Diabetes